The Long Island State Park Commission was created in 1924 by the New York State Legislature to build and operate parks and parkways on Long Island.  Governor Al Smith was appointed as its first President, and Robert Moses, who had drafted the bill creating the Commission served until 1953.  The Commission was abolished in 1977, its parks being taken over by the New York State Office of Parks, Recreation and Historic Preservation and its parkways by the New York State Department of Transportation.

References

Postcard of the West Bath House at Jones Beach State Park (CardCow.com)
Hither Hills State Park (Vintage Views of New York)

Long Island
Local government in New York (state)
State parks of New York (state)
Organizations established in 1924
1977 disestablishments in New York (state)
1924 establishments in New York (state)
Government in the New York metropolitan area

Special districts of New York (state)